The Women's 50 metre backstroke S2 swimming event at the 2004 Summer Paralympics was competed on 27 September. It was won by Sara Carracelas García, representing .

Final round

27 Sept. 2004, evening session

References

W
2004 in women's swimming